Centris lanosa is a species of centridine bee in the family Apidae. It is found in North America.

References

Further reading

External links

 

Apinae
Articles created by Qbugbot
Insects described in 1872